The following is a timeline of the history of the city of Karachi, Pakistan.

Prior to 18th century 

 326 BCE Alexander the Great set sail from Manora island in Karachi to Babylonia
 712 CE Muhammad bin Qasim conquers Sindh 
 977 to 1524 CE Ghaznavid Empire and then the Delhi Sultanate
 1058 CE Soomra Dynasty Soomro period from 1058 to 1351
 1351 CE Samma Dynasty assumed rule over Sindh
 1526 - 1821 CE Mughal ascendancy (1526–1707), nominal rule by Mughals (1707–1857)
 1521 - 1554 CE Arghun dynasty ruled Sindh
 1555 - 1612 CE Tarkhan Dynasty controlled Sindh
 1568 CE Debal was attacked by the Portuguese Admiral Fernão Mendes Pinto in an attempt to capture or destroy the Ottoman vessels anchored there.
 1612 - 1700 CE – Mughal Emperor Akbar conquers Sindh and ruled it via governors

18th-19th centuries

 1701 to 1783 CE – Kalhora Dynasty ruled Sindh
 1729 - Kalachi-jo Ghote founded.
 1783 to 1843 CE – Talpur Dynasty ruled Sindh
 1838 - Population: 15,000.
 1839 - British military occupation begins.
 1843 - Town becomes part of colonial British India.
 1847
 Town becomes part of Sind Division, Bombay Presidency, British India.
 Karachi Anglo-Indian School founded.
 1852
 Municipal Commission established.
 Karachi Fair begins.
 1854 - Napier Mole built connecting Kiamari Island.
 1858 - Agra and Masterman's Bank branch established.
 1860 - Karachi Chamber of Commerce established.
 1861 - St Patrick's High School, Karachi established
 Scinde, Punjab & Delhi Railway (Kotri-Karachi) begins operating.
 1862 - St Joseph's Convent School (Karachi) established
 1865 - Frere Hall built.
 1868 - St Andrew's Church built.
 1871 - Sind Club founded.
 1872 -
 Karachi Boat Club founded.
 Population: 62,384.
 1873 - Manora breakwater constructed in harbour.
 1878 - Karachi Zoo established.
 1881 - Population: 68,332 (town); 5,228 (cantonment).
 Saint Patrick's Cathedral, Karachi built
 1882 - Sindh Arts College inaugurated.
 1885 - Tramway begins operating.
 1886
 Denso Hall built.
 Goa-Portuguese Association established.
 1887 - Karachi Port Trust opens.
 1889 - Empress Market built.
 1891 - Population: 105,199.
 1892 - Merewether Clock Tower built.
 1894 - Karachi Parsi Gymkhana established.
 1898 - Frere Street Station built.

20th century

1900s-1940s

 1901 - Population: 115,407.
 1902 - Karachi is the capital of Province of Sind.
 1910 - Young Men's Zoroastrian Association established.
 1912 - Karachi Zarthosti Banu Mandal established.
 1913
 Karachi Electric Supply Company incorporated.
 Karachi Race Club established.
 1914 - Freemasons Lodge built.
 1916 - Sind Quadrangular cricket tournament established.
 1920 - Jehangir Kothari Parade inaugurated.
 1921
 Population: 216,000.
 Prince of Wales Engineering College (now NED University of Engineering & Technology) founded.
 1923 - Ida Rieu School for blind, deaf, dumb and children with other disabilities was founded
 1925 - Hindu Gymkhana built.
 1926 - Karachi Rugby Football Club founded.
 1927 - Mohatta Palace (residence) built.
 1929 - Airstrip active.
 1932 - Karachi Municipal Corporation Building inaugurated.
 1933
 Karachi Cotton Association incorporated.
 Rotary Club established.
 November: Jamshed Nusserwanjee Mehta becomes first elected Mayor of Karachi.
 1934 - August: Teakum Dass Vadhumull becomes Mayor of Karachi.
 1935 - May: Qazi Khuda Buksh becomes Mayor of Karachi.
 1936
 City becomes capital of Sindh Province, British India.
 May: K.B. Aradsher H. Mama becomes Mayor of Karachi.
 1937 - May: Durgha Das B. Adwani becomes Mayor of Karachi.
 1938 - May: Hatim A. Alvi becomes Mayor of Karachi.
 1939 - May: R.K. Sidhwa becomes Mayor of Karachi.
 1940
 Daily Jang newspaper begins publication.
 May: Lalji Malhootra becomes Mayor of Karachi.
 1941
 Population: 435,000.
 Dow Medical College established.
 May: Muhammad Hashim Gazdar  becomes Mayor of Karachi.
 1942
 Karachi Cantonment established by British Indian Army.
 May: Soharab K.H.Katrak becomes Mayor of Karachi.
 1943 - May: Shambo Nath Molraaj becomes Mayor of Karachi.
 1944 - May: Yusuf Haroon becomes Mayor of Karachi.
 1945
 Advani College of Commerce & Economics established.
 May: Manuel Misquita becomes Mayor of Karachi.
 1946
 Millat Gujarati-language newspaper begins publication.
 May: Wishram Das Dewan Das becomes Mayor of Karachi.

Independence: since 1947
 1947
 Karachi Stock Exchange founded.
 Pakistan Institute of International Affairs headquartered in city.
 Pakistan Navy headquartered in Liaquat Barracks.
 University of Sindh founded.
 May: Hakeem Muhammad Ahsan becomes Mayor of Karachi.
 August: Dawn newspaper begins publication of Karachi edition.
 1948
 Beach Luxury Hotel built.
 Federal Capital Territory administrative area created (containing Karachi city and surrounding area).
 Holy Family Hospital, Karachi established.
St. Joseph's College for Women founded.
 January: Pakistan Socialist Party founded.
 May: Ghulam Ali Allana becomes Mayor of Karachi.
 July: City becomes federal capital of Pakistan.
 1949 - Civil and Military Gazette Karachi edition begins publication.

1950s-1990s

 1950 - Federation of Pakistan Chamber of Commerce & Industry headquartered in city.
 1951
 University of Karachi established.
 National Museum of Pakistan opens in Frere Hall.
 Population: 1,009,438 city; 1,126,417 urban agglomeration.
 Edhi Foundation headquartered in city.
 April: Allah Bakhsh Gabol becomes Mayor of Karachi.
 1952
 St. Patrick's College founded.
 Nazimabad suburb developed.
 1953
 Karachi Municipal Aquarium built.
 H.M. Habibullah Paracha becomes Mayor of Karachi.
 1954
 Pakistan Maritime Museum active.
 Hamdard Foundation established.
 January: Mahmoud Haroon becomes Mayor of Karachi.
 1955
 National Stadium opens.
 May: Al-Haj Malik Bagh Ali becomes Mayor of Karachi.
 1956 - May: Siddique Wahab becomes Mayor of Karachi.
 1957 - Karachi Development Authority, Pakistan Institute of Development Economics, and Pakistan National Scientific Documentation Centre established.
 1958
 Federal capital relocated from Karachi to Rawalpindi.
 Karachi Press Club established.
 May: S.M. Taufiq becomes Mayor of Karachi.
 1959 - Karachi Chamber of Commerce & Industry established.
 1961
 Adamjee Government Science College and Islamia Science College established.
 Aisha Bawany Academy opens.
 May: Allah Bakhsh Gabol becomes Mayor of Karachi for the second time. 
 1962 - Daily News English-language newspaper begins publication.
 1963
 Construction begins on Habib Bank Plaza.
 Aghaz Urdu-language newspaper begins publication.
 Sindh Industrial Trading Estate established.
 1964 - Goethe-Institut Karachi active.
 1965
 Business Recorder newspaper begins publication.
 Clifton Fish Aquarium opens.
 1966 - Pakistan Navy Engineering College active.
 1968 - Bambino Cinema opens.
 1969
 Karachi Circular Railway begins operating.
 Hill Park laid out.
 Masjid e Tooba (mosque) built.
 1970
 Jasarat Urdu-language newspaper begins publication.
 Jinnah Mausoleum and Liaquat National Memorial Library constructed.
 December: City hosts Islamic Foreign Ministers' conference.
 1971 - December: Indo-Pakistani Naval War of 1971.
 1972
 Habib Bank Plaza completed.
 Karachi labour unrest of 1972.
 Aziz Bhatti Park developed.
 November: Karachi Nuclear Power Plant commissioned.
 Population: 3,498,634.
 1973 - Applied Economics Research Centre established at University of Karachi.
 1975 - Pakistan Naval Station Mehran (military base) commissioned.
 1978
 All Pakistan Muttahidda Students Organization founded.
 Star Cinema opens in Saddar district.
 Islamic Chamber of Commerce and Industry headquartered in city.
 1979 - Abdul Sattar Afghani becomes Mayor of Karachi.
 1980
 Orangi Pilot Project established.
 Defence Housing Authority, Karachi opens.
 1981
 City area expands to 730 square miles (from 285 square miles).
 Population: 5,180,562.
 1985 - Karachi Hilton hotel built.
 1986
 August: Muttahida Qaumi Movement rally.
 5 September: Pan Am Flight 73 hijacked.
 December: Pathan-Muhajir conflict.
 1987 - VM Art Gallery founded.
 1988
 Qaumi Akhbar Urdu-language newspaper begins publication.
 Farooq Sattar becomes Mayor of Karachi.
 Defence Authority Degree College for Men established.
 1989 - Indus Valley School of Art and Architecture founded.
 1990
 Jago Sindhi-language newspaper begins publication.
 Pakistan Air Force Museum and Quaid-e-Azam House museum established.
 1992 - Jinnah International Airport new terminal built.
 1994 - Daily Awam Urdu-language newspaper and Financial Post English-language newspaper begin publication.
 1995 - Shaheed Zulfiqar Ali Bhutto Institute of Science and Technology established.
 1996
 20 September: Politician Murtaza Bhutto killed.
 International School established.
 1997
 Health Oriented Preventive Education was founded in July.
 1998
 Daily Express Urdu-language newspaper begins publication.
 Faran Mosque built.
 Population: 9,339,023.
 2000
 International Defence Exhibition and Seminar begins.
 Karachi Central District divided into 4 towns: Gulberg Town, Liaquatabad Town, New Karachi Town, North Nazimabad Town.
 Karachi East District divided into 4 towns: Gulshan Town, Korangi Town, Landhi Town, Shah Faisal Town.
 Karachi South District divided into 3 towns: Jamshed Town, Lyari Town, Saddar Town.
 Karachi West District divided into 4 towns: Baldia Town, Kemari Town, Orangi Town, SITE Town.
 Malir District divided into 3 towns: Bin Qasim Town, Gadap Town, Malir Town.

21st century

2000s

 2001
 Naimatullah Khan becomes Mayor of Karachi.
 Vasl Artists' Collective founded.
 Kara Film Festival begins.
 2003 - Universe Cineplex opens.
 2004 - Karachi Dolphins cricket team formed.
 2005
 Syed Mustafa Kamal becomes Mayor of Karachi.
 National Academy of Performing Arts established.
 MCB Tower built.
 2007
 12 May at least 42 people killed and 140 injured in riots when CJP Iftikhar Muhammad Chaudhry came to address the city bar association on the 50th anniversary of the establishment of the Supreme Court of Pakistan.
 18 October: Bombing of Benazir Bhutto motorcade.
 Bagh Ibne Qasim (park) inaugurated.
 2008
 Peoples' Aman Committee founded in Lyari.
 Arts Council Theatre Academy established.
 2009
 13 December: Bank robbery.
 Air pollution in Karachi reaches annual mean of 88 PM2.5 and 290 PM10, much higher than recommended.

2010s

 2010
 Karachi Literature Festival begins.
 Express Tribune English-language newspaper begins publication.
 October: Bombing.
 2011
 Karachi Metropolitan Corporation revived.
 22 May: PNS Mehran attack.
 September: Floods.
 Dolmen Mall Clifton in business.
 2012
 April: Lyari police operation begins
 11 September: Garment factory fire in Baldia Town.
 Ocean Tower built.
 2013
 3 March: Bombing of Shia area in Abbas Town.
 26 June: Bombing on Burns Road.
 7 August: Bombing in Lyari.
 2014
 21–22 February: Karachi Children's Literature Festival was held.
 2015
 3 March: Karachi recognised as the cheapest city in the world by the Economist Intelligence Unit (EIU).
 2017 - Population: 14,910,352.

2020s

 2020 - Kemari District created.

See also
 History of Karachi
 Timeline of Pakistani history
 Banbhore (near present-day Karachi), 1st century BCE - 13th century CE
 Timelines of other cities in Pakistan: Lahore, Peshawar
 Urbanisation in Pakistan

References

Bibliography

Published in 19th century

Published in 20th century
1900s–1940s
 
 
 
1950s–1990s

Published in 21st century

External links

 

Years in Pakistan
Karachi-related lists
 
Karachi
Urbanisation in Pakistan
karachi